Klik may refer to:
 KLIK, an AM radio station broadcasting out of Jefferson City, Missouri
 Klik (candy), an Israeli candy brand marketed by Unilever
 KLIK Amsterdam Animation Festival, an animation festival organised annually in Amsterdam, The Netherlands
 Klik (Clickteam), a software produced by French company Clickteam
 Klik (packaging method), former name of the portable software format AppImage
KLIK (Klebelsberg Központ), Hungarian ministry of public education

See also
 Click (disambiguation)